Hohenlimburg may refer to:

Hagen-Hohenlimburg, formerly known as Limburg an der Lenne, a present-day borough of the city of Hagen, Germany
Limburg-Hohenlimburg, a county in medieval Germany